Methylpropylamine may refer to:

 sec-Butylamine (1-methylpropylamine)
 tert-Butylamine (2-methyl-2-propylamine)
 N-Methylpropylamine